Russians are a small diaspora in France but one of the most important groups in the Russian diaspora.

History 

The French Riviera was a favorite spot, where the European aristocracy had launched the fashion of the rainy season. Some also came there to treat tuberculosis which was then rampant. The Empress Alexandra Feodorovna, wife of the late Nicolas I, liked to stay there to rest since her widowhood. She raised money in 1856 to build a church for the parish. The  was consecrated on December 31, 1859 in the city of Nice, which at that time had more than 45 000 inhabitants and was part with its County of the Kingdom of Sardinia, belonging to the House of Savoy, before being annexed to the French Empire by plebiscite a few months later in April 1860. In December 1912, half a century later, the Russian Orthodox Cathedral would be consecrated in memory of Nicholas Alexandrovich, Tsarevich of Russia, who died in Nice. The building itself and the parcel of land on which it stands has been the property of the Russian state to this day.

Russian Civil War
Of an approximate figure of 1.5 million exiles during the Russian Civil War, about 400,000 have taken up residence in France. Political refugees, White émigré gather around charities like the Zemgor Committee and the company of the Russian Red Cross, the St. Sergius Orthodox Theological Institute (founded in 1924) and the Action chrétienne des étudiants russes (ACER ) (1926), which provided to their community an associative link, political and religious, as well as material aid.
As a symbol of this massive immigration, 10,000 Russians are buried at Sainte-Geneviève-des-Bois Russian Cemetery.

Exodus of White Russians in Corsica

The ship "Rion", carrying some 3422 refugees (Russians, Ukrainians and Cossacks) from Constantinople to Brazil had stopped in Ajaccio, on May 15, 1921 at 2 am. Ajaccio, an island city of 20,000 inhabitants, saw in one day its population increase by 20%. On May 25, 10 days after the arrival of the ship, some 600 refugees were finally allowed to land and settle at the Livrelli barracks, located in the center of Ajaccio.

Notable people

 Igor and Grichka Bogdanoff
 Olga Kurylenko
 Olga Khokhlova
 Nicholas Alexandrovich
 Alexandre Alekhine
 Mary Marquet
 Arthur Adamov
 Élie Metchnikoff

See also
Russian Expeditionary Force in France
Russian diaspora
France–Russia relations
Chechens in France

References

Ethnic groups in France
Society of France
 
Immigration to France by country of origin
France
France